San Martino di Castrozza is a mountain resort in the Primiero valley in the Trentino province in Italy. The western part, with 428 inhabitants, is in the comune of Siror, with the eastern, housing 135 inhabitants, in Tonadico.

History 

The first buildings on the site of San Martino were a religious institution, the hospice of saints Martino and Giuliano, which welcomed travelers crossing the Alps by the Rolle Pass between the valleys of Primiero and Fiemme. All that remains of the hospice is the church of San Martino, which has a romanesque bell-tower.

The first alpine hotel in San Martino was built by the Irish traveller, John Ball in 1873. By the first decade of the 20th century San Martino di Castrozza was already established as a tourist destination for the wealthy of the Austro-Hungarian Empire, of which Trentino then formed part. The resort was rebuilt after the devastation of the First World War, and grew rapidly thereafter.

Geography
San Martino is situated in a valley of green meadows, in the Natural Park of Paneveggio-Pale di San Martino. It is surrounded by peaks of the Dolomites, including the Pale di San Martino, of which the highest peaks are Vezzana and the Cimon della Pala.

In culture 
 Arthur Schnitzler's 1924 novella Fräulein Else is set in San Martino di Castrozza.

References

External links
 Azienda per il Turismo San Martino di Castrozza

Frazioni of Trentino
Ski areas and resorts in Italy